XV is the tenth Japanese studio album by South Korean pop duo Tohoshinki, released on October 16, 2019 by Avex Trax. XV (fifteen) denotes Tohoshinki's fifteenth debut anniversary in Japan. The duo announced the album's release at the A-Nation Music Festival, which they headlined, on August 18, 2019. XV was released in five physical versions: a standard CD version, a limited CD and Blu-ray version, a limited CD and DVD version, an exclusive fan club version, and a special "gift" version with a CD packaged in two different LP-size slips. Musically, XV is a varied electropop album that is influenced by a broad range of electronic musical genres, including influences from symphonic metal, soft rock, hip hop, dance-pop, and R&B. Recording for the album began shortly before the launch of their Japanese studio album Tomorrow in 2018.

"Jealous" was released as the album's lead single on November 21, 2018. The track debuted at number one on the Oricon Singles Chart and peaked at number three on the Billboard Japan Hot 100. "Hot Hot Hot" and "Mirrors" were released as a double A-side single on July 31, 2019, debuting at number two on the Oricon Singles Chart.

XV is Tohoshinki's eighth album to debut at number one on the Oricon Albums Chart, setting a new record for a foreign artist in Japan. The album also debuted at number one on Billboard Japan Hot Albums, with first-week sales of 155,000 copies.

XV is the accompanying album for Tohoshinki's XV Tour, the duo's sixth nationwide dome tour in Japan.

Background and release
On May 23, 2019, Tohoshinki announced that they would be holding their fourth nationwide five-Dome tour in Japan from November 2019 to January 2020. They referred the tour as their fifteenth anniversary concert. On August 18, during their headlining appearance at the A-Nation Music Festival, Tohoshinki formally announced XV as their upcoming album. Their official website updated new details moments later. The Roman numerals XV denotes 15, referring to Tohoshinki's 15th debut anniversary in Japan. Like its namesake, the record is composed of 15 tracks.

A website for XV opened in September 2018. Two fan projects were launched to commemorate Tohoshinki's fifteenth anniversary; the first is a short movie consisting of fans being interviewed about their memories of being a Tohoshinki fan; the second is a dance workshop led by Tohoshinki's dance team. On September 11, Avex dropped a promotional image to media outlets and opened a "limited time" Twitter account for the album. The Twitter account will be opened from September 11 to November 8, 2019. Cover photos and the track list of XV were revealed on September 13, 2019. On September 29, Avex released 30-second teasers of each new track, dropping one new teaser per hour starting at 08:00 JST on Twitter.

Promotion
The dance track "Jealous" was released as the album's lead single on November 21, 2018. The single debuted at number one on the Oricon Singles Chart — their first number one single on the chart since "Catch Me -If you wanna-" (2013) — and charted for 10 weeks. It peaked at number three on the Billboard Japan Hot 100. The single was Tohoshinki's 13th number one single on the Oricon, putting Tohoshinki as the foreign artist with the most number one singles in Japan. The music video of "Jealous" was released on YouTube on October 31, 2018.

"Hot Hot Hot" and "Mirrors" were released as a double A-side single on July 31, 2019. It debuted at number two on the Oricon Singles Chart. "Hot Hot Hot" peaked at number four on the Billboard Japan Hot 100 and "Mirrors" peaked at a moderate 46. The light-hearted "Hot Hot Hot" has been compared to Tohoshinki's previous summer singles "Ocean" and "Sweat", respectively taken from the albums Tree (2014) and With (2015). The music video for "Hot Hot Hot" was released July 19, 2019. The darker, rock-inspired "Mirrors" was used as the theme song for Asahi TV's prime-time television drama Sign (2019). A short movie of "Mirrors", intercepted with scenes from Sign, dropped on August 23, 2019.

"Guilty" was the album's final promotional track. The music video was released on YouTube on September 25, 2019. The duo debuted their performance of "Guilty" on Fuji TV's Music Fair on October 12, 2019. On October 15, a day before the album's release, they performed "Guilty" on NHK's Utacon. Their performance trended worldwide on Twitter, at number 11.

Though not released in the album, a music video for the dance track "Hot Sauce" was released on YouTube on October 23, 2019.

Reception
XV topped the daily Oricon Albums Chart on the first day of release, selling 105,884 copies. It maintained its top position on the weekly Oricon Albums Chart with 155,153 albums sold, already exceeding the lifelong sales of their previous studio album Tomorrow (2018). XV is Tohoshinki's eighth album to enter the Oricon at number one, setting a new record as the first and only foreign artist in Japan with eight number-one albums. It also debuted at number one on the Billboard Japan Hot Albums and Top Album Sales with 160,872 units. 13 tracks in the album entered mu-mo's Weekly Download Chart, with "Guilty" peaking at number three.

XV has received generally positive reviews from J-pop music critics. Japanese website Real Sound commended the album for taking a more aggressive attitude towards lyrics, music, and vocal style, yet still retaining the colorful pop sound that Tohoshinki have been known for.

Track listing

Notes
The Bigeast limited edition is only available for purchase at the Bigeast Official Shop, which requires Bigeast membership.

Personnel
Adapted from the album liner notes.

Tohoshinki – all vocals 
Tsukiko Nakamura – background vocals 
The Philharmonic Chorus of Tokyo – background vocals 
Hiroaki Takeuchi – background vocals 
Team T – background vocals 
Hi-yunk (BACK-ON) – producer, composer, all instruments 
Matthew Tishler – producer, composer, all instruments 
Crash Cover – producer, all instruments 
Ryosuke "Dr. R" Sakai – producer, composer, all instruments 
Jonas Jeberg – producer, composer 
Nicolas Scapa – producer, composer 
John Read Fasse – producer, composer 
Mats Valentin – producer, composer 
Willie Weeks – producer, composer, all instruments 
Shinjiroh Inoue – producer 
Benny Jansson – producer, composer 
UTA – producer, composer 
Chris Wahle – producer, composer, all instruments 
Yoichiro Kakizaki – producer, piano 
Steve Manovski – producer, composer 
Elizabeth Russo – composer 
Kara Madden – composer 
Elizabeth Abrams – composer 
Lola Blanc – composer 
Brandon Wollman – composer 
Neil Ormandy – composer 
Dillon Deskin – composer 
Michael John Hancock – composer 
William James McAuley III – composer 
Kyler Niko – composer 
Mami Yamada – composer 
Jonathan Bratthall-Tideman – composer 
Sunny Boy – composer 
Didrik Thott – composer 
Chris Meyer – composer 
Katsuhiko Yamamoto – composer 
Craig Smart – composer 
Shaun Smith – composer 
Casey May – composer 
Jenson Vaughan – composer 
Blue – all instruments 
Udai Shika Strings – strings 
Masao Fuknaga – percussion 
Satoshi Shoji – oboe 
Kaori Obata – horn 
Chieko Kinbara Strings – strings 
Katsutoshi Yasuhara – track director 
Atsushu Hattori – mixer , recorder 
Naoki Yamada – mixer 
Yoshiaki Onishi – mixer 
Shinpei Yamada – mixer, recorder 
Makoto Yamadoi – recorder , mixer 
Takeshi Takizawa – recorder

Charts

Year-end charts

Sales

Release history

See also
TVXQ albums discography
List of Oricon number-one albums of 2019

References

External links
 Tohoshinki official website
 Tohoshinki XV official website
 

2019 albums
TVXQ albums
Avex Group albums
Japanese-language albums
IRiver albums
Albums produced by Steve Manovski